This article covers the 2016–17 season for Kukësi. They'll participate in the Kategoria Superiore, Albanian Supercup and the Albanian Cup. The club also started the season in the UEFA Europa League but were eliminated in the second qualifying round by Austrian club Austria Wien.

Squad

First team squad
.

Transfers

In

Loan in

Out

Competitions

Kategoria Superiore

League table

Results summary

Result round by round

Matches

Albanian Cup

First round

Second round

Quarter-finals

Albanian Supercup

UEFA Europa League

First qualifying round

Second qualifying round

Notes

References

External links
Soccerway

Kukësi
FK Kukësi seasons
Albanian football championship-winning seasons